Torill Eide (born 24 February 1950) is a Norwegian children's writer.

She made her literary debut in 1978 with Ville så gjerne fortelle om sommeren..., a book for young adults. Among her other books are Det vil komme nye dager from 1983 and Huletur from 1988. She was awarded the Brage Prize in 1993 for Skjulte ærend.

References

1950 births
Living people
Norwegian children's writers
Norwegian women children's writers
20th-century Norwegian women writers
21st-century Norwegian women writers